Marbach is a borough (Ortsbezirk) of Marburg in Hesse. Marbach has a current population of approx. 3,400 inhabitants.

History 
Marbach was mentioned in 1272 with the name Marpah. Also it was noticed in the register of the city of Marburg in 1374, where Marbach was a small village of the Landgraves of Thuringia, beside the other districts Ockershausen, Wehrda and Cappel.

Notable people 
 Heinrich Freudenstein (1 Feb.1863 in Maden – 15 February 1935), popular beekeeper, former mayor of Marbach (1919–1934) and builder of the elementary school

References

Further reading
in German:
 Marbuch. 7. Auflage. Marbuch, Marburg 2003,  (umfassend, mit Stadtplan).
 Dettmering, Erhart: Kleine Marburger Stadtgeschichte. Pustet, Regensburg 2007, .

External links 
 Information about Marbach at www.marburg.de 
 

Districts of Marburg